Aksaray Province is a province in central Turkey. Its adjacent provinces are Konya along the west and south, Niğde to the southeast, Nevşehir to the east, and Kırşehir to the north. The provincial capital is the city of Aksaray.
Aksaray is one of the four provinces in the area of Cappadocia, along with Nevşehir, Niğde and Kayseri. Also the  volcano Mount Hasan stands between Aksaray and Niğde. Summers are hot and dry on the plain, but the area is green and covered in flowers in springtime, when water streams off the mountainside.

Districts

Aksaray province is divided into 8 districts (capital district in bold):
 Ağaçören
 Aksaray
 Eskil
 Gülağaç
 Güzelyurt
 Ortaköy
 Sarıyahşi
 Sultanhanı

Etymology
In antiquity the area was named Archelais Garsaura, which was mutated to Taksara during the Seljuk Turkish era, and then to Aksaray. Aksaray means "White Palace" in Turkish.

Aksaray Castle 
the Aksaray Castle was a four-cornered, stone-built, solidly built castle on a large area, on the edge of the Melendiz river. It was built in the middle of the city. The bastion and its towers were not very high. With all their bastions, teeth and bodies, their crenellated holes and their calculated towers always faced each other. During the siege, the strong warriors of each tower guarded the towers with rifles. There were five gates on the side of the fortresses. Küçükkapı faces west. Demirkapı opens to the qibla. Keçikapısı also opens towards the qibla. Ereğlikapısı opens to the south and Konyakapısı opens to the west. The guards of these gates are the tax collectors. A warehouse was built in the castle to store wheat during the rebels' time. It has no arsenal. There are big balls thrown during Ramadan and other festivals.

Population

History

The plains of central Anatolia have been settled for 8,000 years, and the area around Aksaray bears monuments to a string of civilisations that have settled on the plain in that time. The mound of Aşıklı Höyük in the town of Kızılkaya indicates a settlement dating back to 5,000BC (and also a skull of a woman who had apparently been trepanned, the earliest known record of brain surgery).

Later the Silk Road came through here so caravanserai and then larger and larger settlements were built to supply and shelter travellers and traders. The city and surroundings of Aksaray thrived in the Roman, Byzantine and the Turkish periods.

Today Aksaray is a rural, agricultural province, its people religious and conservative. Since the 1950s many have moved to Europe as migrant workers. The population of Aksaray has long included a higher proportion of Kurdish people than most central Anatolian provinces. Many of them were resettled here from Tunceli and other eastern cities following the Sheikh Said rebellion in the 1920s.

Places of interest
 Aksaray Grand Mosque
 Red Minaret Mosque
 Aşıklı Höyük - a Neolithic settlement 25 km east of the city of Aksaray.
 Sultan Han - a large Seljuk caravanserai in the town of Sultanhani.
 Aksaray Museum
 Acemhöyük - an early Bronze Age settlement, 18 km north-west of the city of Aksaray.
 The ancient city of Nora, in the village of Helvadere near the city of Aksaray.
 Ihlara valley - a canyon, 40 km from the city of Aksaray, in the district of Güzelyurt
 Saratlı Kırkgöz Underground City
 St. Mercurius Underground City
 Mount Hasan and Küçük Hasandağı
 Mokissos - ruins of an ancient city
 Helvadere Göleti
 Güzelyurt Dam Pond
 Sofular valley - an abandoned village in Gülağaç and Nenezi Dağı
 Bekar Sultan Tomb - located near the village of Bekar. The tomb was built in the 12th century during the Anatolian Seljuk period.
 Ağzıkara Han
 Lake Nar - a brackish lake separating Aksaray Province from Niğde
 Belisirma - a restaurant on the Melendiz River
 Sivişli Kilise - The St. Anargirios church, also known as Sivisli Church in Güzelyurt Monastery Valley
 St. Ayios Antonios Church - ruins in Çeltek, near Çanlı Kilise
 Karagedik Kilise - a ruined church in the village of Belisırma, formerly known as St. Ermolaos Church
 Selime Cathedral - a rock-cut cathedral in Güzelyürt, used as a castle during the reign of the Seljuks.
 Kilise Camii - Mosque Church, also known as the St. Gregory of Nazianzus Church in Güzelyurt
 Kizil Kilise - "Red Church", also known as St. Spyridon Church
 Yüksek Kilise - the High church, also known as St. Analipsis (St. Mamas) Church

See also 
List of populated places in Aksaray Province
 Aksaray Malaklisi
 Lake Tuz Natural Gas Storage

Gallery

References

 Site di Aksaray

External links 

 
  Aksaray municipality's official website
 High resolution pictures of the city
 Aksaray weather forecast information
 Aksaray Governorship
 Aksaray 
 Aksaray Municipality
 localnet iller 
  Aksaray University student websites

Notes